Ion Perju (born 5 November 1971) is a Moldovan politician. He served as Minister of Agriculture, Regional Development and Environment from 14 November 2019 to 23 December 2020 in the cabinet of Prime Minister Ion Chicu. He continued to serve in this position with Aureliu Ciocoi as acting Prime Minister until 6 August 2021.

References 

Living people
1971 births
Place of birth missing (living people)
21st-century Moldovan politicians